State Route 487 (SR 487) is a north–south state highway in White Pine County, Nevada. The route follows Baker Road from the Utah–Nevada state line southeast of Baker to U.S. Route 6 and U.S. Route 50 (US 6 and US 50). The route was previously known as State Route 73 prior to 1976. SR 487 is designated as a Nevada Scenic Byway.

Route description

SR 487 begins as at the Utah state line northwest of Garrison, Utah as the continuation of Utah State Route 21, which serves the towns of Milford and Beaver. From there, the route heads northwesterly on Baker Road through the desert terrain. The highway comes upon the town of Baker, near which there are pockets of farmland. In Baker, the route intersects Lehman Caves Road (SR 488), which is the gateway to Great Basin National Park. Leaving the town, SR 487 continues northwesterly through more desert lands.

History
Baker Road first appears on official Nevada state highway maps as far back as 1937. Although the state's tourist maps did not show Baker Road carrying the State Route 73 designation until 1942, other state maps show the route number existing on the highway by 1937. The route was upgraded to a gravel road by 1948, and was fully paved by 1949.

SR 73 was eliminated from the state highway system as part of a mass renumbering of Nevada's state routes. The State Route 487 designation was assigned to the former alignment of SR 73 on July 1, 1976. The resulting change in the highway number was first seen on the 1978–79 edition of the official highway map. Since its re-designation as SR 487, there has not been any major changes to Baker Road.

The Nevada Department of Transportation designated State Route 487 as a Nevada Scenic Byway on March 27, 2000, simultaneously with SR 488 and the portion of US 6/US 50 near the highway's northern terminus.

Major intersections

See also

References

External links

487
487
Transportation in White Pine County, Nevada